A lightning prediction system is a type of lightning detection equipment that determines when atmospheric conditions likely to produce lightning strikes and sounds an alarm, warning those nearby that lightning is imminent and giving them the chance to find safety before the storm arrives in the area. Lightning protection systems are often installed in outdoor areas which are often congested with people, lack sufficient shelter, and are difficult to evacuate quickly (such as water parks, college campuses, and large swimming pool or athletic field complexes). These locations are particularly dangerous during lightning storms. Prediction systems are prone to false alarms as they respond to conditions that are not always attributed to a developing thunderstorm. Electric field data is typically used in conjunction with detection information to limit false positives.

Description

The detection equipment is designed to constantly survey atmospheric electrical activity and potential for lightning occurrence via radar and other methods. Storms are scanned by radar to determine the degree of electrification and potential for lightning occurrence.

The method used by such systems includes the stationing of at least three receivers at known locations in order to triangulate their data. When any of the receivers detects a strong electrical disturbance, the location is shared with other receivers in the area for corroboration, and then (presuming the data has passed the filters), encoded and transmitted to a central facility and thereafter processed for deriving the position of the lightning strike. By detecting thunderstorm electrical fields, a track can be predicted to allow warnings as early as 30 minutes before lightning strikes the protected area. The system is synchronized with the U.S. Coast Guard LORAN navigation network, and includes various features which permit a more accurate analysis of lightning position.

While some systems require manual remote activation of the siren from the central monitoring facility, others work automatically. These systems can also sound an "All Clear" tone when electrical activity in the monitored area has receded to safe levels. This feature eliminates both the need for skilled monitoring of the system as well as the chance for human error in interpreting the data.

See also
 Early warning system
 Franklin bells

Lightning

de:Blitz#Ortung
es:Detector de rayos
fr:Détecteur de foudre
ja:雷検知器
pl:Wykrywacz piorunów
fi:Salamatutka